Sandstad is a former municipality in the old Sør-Trøndelag county, Norway. The  municipality existed from 1914 until its dissolution in 1964 when it was merged into what is now Hitra municipality in Trøndelag county. The former municipality of Sandstad included all of the southern and southeastern parts of the island of Hitra, plus the several islands in the Trondheimsleia off the shores of Hitra. The municipality had one church, Sandstad church, located in the village of Sandstad.

History

On 1 July 1914, the southern district of the municipality Fillan was separated to form a municipality of its own called Sandstad. The initial population was 947. During the 1960s, there were many municipal mergers across Norway due to the work of the Schei Committee. On 1 January 1964, the municipalities of Sandstad, Fillan, Kvenvær, and Hitra were merged to form a new, larger municipality of Hitra. Prior to the merger, the population of Sandstad was 1,028.

Name
The municipality (originally the parish) is named after the old Sandstad farm. The first element is the old male name .

Government
While it existed, this municipality was responsible for primary education (through 10th grade), outpatient health services, senior citizen services, unemployment, social services, zoning, economic development, and municipal roads. During its existence, this municipality was governed by a municipal council of elected representatives, which in turn elected a mayor.

Mayors
The mayors of Sandstad:

 1915-1920: Kasper Utsetø (V)
 1921-1928: Ole Aalmo (H)
 1929-1934: Nils Strøm (H)
 1935-1945: John Aalmo (H)
 1946-1947: Alf Nesset (Ap)
 1948-1955: John Aalmo (H)
 1956-1963: Olaf Sivertsen (Ap)

Municipal council
The municipal council  of Sandstad was made up of 15representatives that were elected to four year terms. The party breakdown of the final municipal council was as follows:

See also
List of former municipalities of Norway

References

Hitra
Former municipalities of Norway
1914 establishments in Norway
1964 disestablishments in Norway